Different for Girls may refer to:
Different for Girls (film), a 1996 film starring Rupert Graves and Steven Mackintosh
Different for Girls (Leslie Mills album), 2003 album by Leslie Mills
Different for Girls: Women Artists and Female-Fronted Bands Cover Joe Jackson 2004
"It's Different for Girls", 1979 song by Joe Jackson
"Different for Girls" (Dierks Bentley song), 2016
"it's different for girls", 2016 song by of Montreal